The 1896 season in Swedish football, starting January 1896 and ending December 1896:

Events 
 8 August 1896: Örgryte IS wins the first Swedish Championship ever by beating IS Idrottens Vänner 3–0 in the final match of the competition. The title is contested in the cup tournament Svenska Mästerskapet—arranged by Svenska Idrottsförbundet—and the two Gothenburg clubs are the only competitors. The match is played on the football field of a Swedish cavalry regiment—Skånska husarregementet—garrisoned in Helsingborg.

Honours

Official titles

Competitions

Domestic results

Svenska Mästerskapet 1896 
Final

References 
Print

Online

 
Seasons in Swedish football